Hymenochirus boulengeri, also known as eastern dwarf clawed frog, is a species of frog in the family Pipidae. It is endemic to northeastern Democratic Republic of the Congo where it is only known from two localities. It is presumably ecologically similar to 
Hymenochirus boettgeri, an aquatic frog that occurs in still, shaded water in lowland rainforest, and in pools by slow-flowing rivers. Threats to this little-known species are unknown.

References

boulengeri
Amphibians described in 1930
Endemic fauna of the Democratic Republic of the Congo
Amphibians of the Democratic Republic of the Congo
Taxa named by Gaston-François de Witte
Taxonomy articles created by Polbot
Northern Congolian forest–savanna mosaic